Joshua Paul Newman (born June 11, 1982) is an American former Major League Baseball relief pitcher.

Biography
A native of Wheelersburg, Ohio, Newman played college baseball at Ohio State, and in 2002 he played collegiate summer baseball with the Harwich Mariners of the Cape Cod Baseball League. He was selected by the Rockies in the 19th round of the 2004 MLB Draft.

He was claimed off waivers by the Royals from the Rockies on July 10, 2008. On May 25, 2009 Newman was released by the Royals. He was signed by the Camden Riversharks on June 27, 2009.

References

External links

1982 births
Living people
Colorado Rockies players
Kansas City Royals players
Baseball players from Ohio
Major League Baseball pitchers
Casper Rockies players
Modesto Nuts players
Tulsa Drillers players
Colorado Springs Sky Sox players
Omaha Royals players
Camden Riversharks players
Ohio State Buckeyes baseball players
Harwich Mariners players
People from Wheelersburg, Ohio
People from Portsmouth, Ohio
21st-century American politicians